The 2023 All-Ireland Senior Hurling Championship Final, the 136th final of the All-Ireland Senior Hurling Championship and the culmination of the 2023 All-Ireland Senior Hurling Championship, is scheduled to be played at Croke Park in Dublin on 23 July 2023.

References

All-Ireland Senior Hurling Championship Final
All-Ireland Senior Hurling Championship Final, 2022
All-Ireland Senior Hurling Championship Finals
All-Ireland Senior Hurling
All-Ireland Senior Hurling Championship Final